HC Devils Milano were an ice hockey team in Milan, Italy. They played in the Serie A.

History
The club dominated the Serie A between 1991 and 1994, winning three straight titles. They also participated in, and won, the Alpenliga in 1991. NHL player Jari Kurri played on the 1991 squad as he tried to force a trade from the Edmonton Oilers.

They moved to Courmayeur in 1996 and became the Devils Courmaosta.

Achievements
Serie A champion : 1992, 1993, 1994
Alpenliga champion : 1991

Notable players
 Jari Kurri
 Rick Morocco

References

External links
Profile on hockeyarenas.net

Defunct ice hockey teams in Italy
Ice hockey clubs established in 1989
1989 establishments in Italy
Sport in Milan
Alpenliga teams
1996 disestablishments in Italy
Ice hockey clubs disestablished in 1996